McClure may refer to:
 McClure (surname)
 McClure's Magazine, a popular United States illustrated monthly magazine at the turn of the 20th century
 McClure (crater), an impact crater on the Moon

In geography:
 McClure, Illinois, USA
 McClure, Ohio, USA
 McClure, Pennsylvania, USA
 McClure, Virginia, USA
 McClure Township, Holt County, Nebraska, USA
 Maclure Glacier, a glacier in Yosemite National Park
 McClure Pass, a mountain pass in Colorado, USA
 M'Clure Strait, a strait on the edge of the Canadian Northwest Territories
 Mount Maclure, a mountain in Yosemite National Park
 Lake McClure, a reservoir in central California, USA

See also
 Morgan-McClure Motorsports, a NASCAR team
McLure